Regionalisation is the tendency to form decentralised regions. 

Regionalisation or land classification can be observed in various disciplines:

In agriculture, see Agricultural Land Classification.
In biogeography, see Biogeography#Biogeographic units.
In ecology, see Ecological land classification.
In geography, it has two ways: the process of delineating the Earth, its small areas or other units into regions and a state of such a delineation.
In globalisation discourse, it represents a world that becomes less interconnected, with a stronger regional focus.
In politics, it is the process of dividing a political entity or country into smaller jurisdictions (administrative divisions or subnational units) and transferring power from the central government to the regions; the opposite of unitarisation. See Regionalism (politics).
In sport, it is when a team has multiple "home" venues in different cities. Examples of regionalized teams include a few teams in the defunct American Basketball Association, or the Green Bay Packers when they played in both Green Bay and Milwaukee from 1933-1994.
 In linguistics, it is when a prestige language adopts features of a regional language, such as how, in medieval times, Church Latin developed regional pronunciation differences in the countries it was used, including Italy, France, Spain, Portugal, England, Germany, Denmark, Hungary, and Slavic countries.

See also
 Regionalism
 Regional autonomy
 Autonomous administrative division

Regions
Decentralization